Busfield Pond is a small lake located north of Hancock in Delaware County, New York. Busfield Pond drains south via an unnamed creek that flows into Sands Creek.

See also
 List of lakes in New York

References 

Lakes of New York (state)
Lakes of Delaware County, New York